Nicaragua competed in the 2015 Pan American Games in Toronto, Canada from July 10-26, 2015.

Baseball player Darrel Campbell Lewis was the flagbearer for the team during the opening ceremony.

Competitors
The following table lists Nicaragua's delegation per sport and gender.

Athletics

Nicaragua entered two track and field athletes (one male and one female).

Track

Field

Baseball

Nicaragua qualified a men's baseball team of 24 athletes.

Men's tournament

Roster

Group A

Beach volleyball

Nicaragua qualified a men's and women's pair.

Boxing

Nicaragua qualified four boxers (three men and one woman).

Rowing

Nicaragua qualified 1 boat and two athletes.

Women

Qualification Legend: FA=Final A (medal); FB=Final B (non-medal); R=Repechage

Shooting

Nicaragua has qualified 3 male shooters.

Men

Swimming

Nicaragua received two wildcards to enter one male and one female swimmer.

Taekwondo

Nicaragua qualified a team of one male athlete, and also received an additional wildcard to enter another male athlete.

Men

Triathlon

Nicaragua received a wildcard to enter one male triathlete.

Men

Weightlifting

Nicaragua qualified one male and one female weightlifter.

Wrestling

Nicaragua received two reallocated spots (one each in men's freestyle and Greco-Roman) and one wildcard in women's freestyle. However, Elverine Jimenez was disqualified from the games for doping. Jimenez did not compete in the event, and her opponent in the first round won by default.

See also
Nicaragua at the 2016 Summer Olympics

References

Nations at the 2015 Pan American Games
P
2015